Willis J. Dance served as a Confederate artillerist in the American Civil War.

Pre-War

Willis Jefferson Dance was born in Virginia on June 21, 1821.  In 1860, Dance lived in Eggleston's District in Powhatan County, Virginia, using the Post Office at Powhatan Court House.  Age 38, he was married to Margaret C. Dance, age 37.  (Their only child died young.)  Dance had real estate valued at $3,500 and personal property valued a $10,000.  He was an attorney and a slave owner.

Civil War

After the outbreak of war, Willis Dance was commissioned captain of the Powhatan Light Artillery on July 16, 1861.  He commanded his battery in the Army of Northern Virginia.  His battery served in the First Virginia Light Artillery under J. Thompson Brown in the Maryland Campaign at the time of the Battle of Antietam, when the battery guarded a ford near Shepherdstown, West Virginia, and the Battle of Fredericksburg in BG William N. Pendleton’s artillery reserve.  At Fredericksburg, Dance's battery sent guns to help Major John Pelham protect the far right of Stonewall Jackson’s corps.

Brown's command served in the artillery reserve of Jackson's corps, under Col Stapleton Crutchfield at the Battle of Chancellorsville.  With the death of Jackson, his corps was reorganized with Ltg Richard S. Ewell as commander.  Col Brown was promoted to command of the artillery reserve of Ewell's Corps.  Dance became acting commander of Brown's artillery battalion in the Gettysburg Campaign.  Guns from his battalion were engaged on Seminary Ridge on July 2 and 3, 1863 during the Battle of Gettysburg.  These batteries were engaged against federal batteries on Cemetery Hill.

Dance returned to battery command after Gettysburg.  He was in BG Armistead L. Long’s artillery command in Ewell's corps.  The battalion was led by Brown and then by Ltc Robert A. Hardaway in the Bristoe Campaign.  In the absence of both officers, Dance briefly led the battalion in the Mine Run Campaign.

Dance commanded his battery in the Overland Campaign and early in the Siege of Petersburg.  At the Battle of Spotsylvania, Dance's battery, with much of Hardaway's battalion, was in the second line of Ewell's corps when the federal II Corps broke through the Confederate defenses.  Dance's guns were moved up to stall the Union advance while southern infantry was brought to plug the gap.

Capt Dance served in the Richmond defenses with Hardway as his battalion leader.  Capt Dance was wounded at the Battle of Chaffin's Farm in September 1864 shortly after the fall of Fort Harrison.  His battery was instrumental in preventing the Union Army of the James from expanding its breakthrough of the Confederate defenses.  When wounded, Dance was acting commander of Hardaway's battalion.  Capt Dance continued with his battery to the end of 1864.

Capt Dance went on sick leave in early 1865.  He was promoted to the rank of major on March 1, 1865, while convalescing.

Post war

Maj Dance resumed law practice after the war.  His nephew Thomas Maurice Miller became a law partner in 1870.  Willis Dance died on February 13, 1887.  Some of letters from his sister can be found in the Virginia Eppes (Dance) Campbell, Papers, 1858–1865, of the Virginia Historical Society.

References
 Sibley, F. Ray, Junior, The Confederate Order of Battle, volume 1, The Army of Northern Virginia, Shippensburg, PA: White Mane, 1996.
 Sommers, Richard J., Richmond Redeemed: The Siege at Petersburg, Garden City, N.Y.: Doubleday, 1981, .
 Wise, Jennings C., The Long Arm of Lee: the History of the Artillery of the Army of Northern Virginia, New York: Oxford University Press, 1959.

1821 births
1887 deaths
Confederate States Army officers
People of Virginia in the American Civil War
People from Powhatan County, Virginia
American slave owners